The American Institutes for Research (AIR) is a nonprofit, nonpartisan behavioral and social science research, evaluation and technical assistance organization based in Arlington, Virginia. One of the world's largest social science research organizations, AIR has more than 1,800 staff in locations across the United States and abroad.

In 2010 and 2011, The Washington Post selected AIR as one of the top ten nonprofit firms in the Washington metropolitan area.

History
AIR's founder, John C. Flanagan, a pioneer in aviation psychology, is known for developing the critical incident technique, an innovative method for screening and selecting personnel. While working for the U.S. Army Air Forces during World War II, Flanagan developed CIT as an aptitude test to identify potential combat pilots.  Later, the technique was adapted for other industries, and CIT is still a model for numerous organizations and researchers.

Flanagan established American Institutes for Research in 1946. He focused on workforce education research and launched Project Talent, a longitudinal study following 400,000 high school students across the U.S., which has continued for the past 50 years and provided data for hundreds of researchers and publications.

Charles Murray, the controversial political scientist, worked at AIR, and left after determining his work was not making a difference.

At the end of 2019, AIR sold its student assessment division to Cambium Learning Group, Inc.

In 2020, AIR acquired IMPAQ, LLC (including subsidiary Maher & Maher), and Kimetrica.

Mission statement
"AIR's mission is to generate and use rigorous evidence that contributes to a better, more equitable world."

Areas of work
AIR conducts behavioral and social science research and delivers technical assistance, both domestically and internationally, in the areas of health, education and workforce productivity. Specific areas include early childhood; P-K-12 education, including teacher, school and district leadership; juvenile justice; mental health and well-being; higher education and career readiness; adult learning and workforce issues; chronic and infectious diseases; patient and family engagement; trauma informed care; healthcare knowledge translation; refugee and migrant populations; and social and emotional learning, among others.

Some of the work Flanagan and AIR are known for includes:
Project Talent, the largest and most comprehensive study of high school students ever conducted in the United States. Data from Project Talent is now being used to conduct research on aging and dementia; core evaluations for U.S. Department of Education programs; technical expertise on implementing the Every Student Succeeds Act (ESSA) and how federal funds are used; Project A, the largest personnel survey in the history of the U.S. Army; and fully or partially-funded federal projects, including Regional Education Labs (RELs) and Comprehensive Centers, National Center for Family Homelessness, Center for Analysis of Longitudinal Data in Education Research (CALDER), College and Career Readiness and Success Center, Center for English Language Learners, among others.

Leadership
Education researcher David Myers is AIR's president and CEO and serves on its board of directors. Myers was senior vice president and chief strategy officer at Mathematica Policy Research prior to joining AIR.

The twelve-member board of directors is led by chair Patricia B. Gurin, professor emerita of social psychology and women's studies at University of Michigan and vice chair Lawrence D. Bobo, a professor of social sciences at Harvard University.

References

External links

Non-profit organizations based in Washington, D.C.
Research institutes in Washington, D.C.
Educational testing and assessment organizations
Think tanks established in 1946
1946 establishments in the United States